Ilgenfritz is a surname. Notable people with the surname include:

Charles H. Ilgenfritz (1837–1920), American Civil War soldier
James Ilgenfritz (born 1978), American composer, bassist, and multi-instrumentalist
Mark Ilgenfritz (born 1952), American football defensive end
William Ilgenfritz (born 1946), American Anglican bishop
Wolfgang Ilgenfritz (1957–2013), Austrian politician